Leira or Leira i Valdres is a village in Nord-Aurdal Municipality in Innlandet county, Norway.

The European route E16 highway runs through the village.

Name
The place is named after the river Leira. The name of the river is derived from leire which means "clay". Leira is a common name of rivers many places in Norway.

References

Nord-Aurdal
Villages in Innlandet